The Royal Air Force Memorial in Albany, Georgia, United States, honors the British Royal Air Force Cadets buried in Albany and stands as a memorial to all British cadets who trained in the U.S. during World War II.   It is located in Crown Hill Cemetery.

See also
 War memorial

References

Royal Air Force memorials
Monuments and memorials in Georgia (U.S. state)
Buildings and structures in Albany, Georgia
World War II memorials in the United States
Tourist attractions in Albany, Georgia